10x10 or 10×10 may refer to:
 10x10 (film), a 2018 American thriller film
 10x10 (album), an album by Ronnie Montrose
 "10x10", a filmmaker challenge at Sacramento Film and Music Festival
 10×10 draughts, a synonym of international draughts
 "10x10", a song by the American group the Temptations from the 1987 album Together Again
 "10x10", a song by the English electronic music group 808 State from the 1993 album Gorgeous
 "10x10", a song by the American band Yeah Yeah Yeahs from the 2007 EP Is Is

See also 
 1010 (disambiguation)
 Ten10 (disambiguation)